Esquimalt was a provincial electoral district in the province of British Columbia, Canada. It was one of the province's first twelve ridings upon its entry into Confederation. It was originally a two-member riding. Its successor riding today is Esquimalt-Metchosin.

Election results 
Note: Winners of each election are in bold.

|-

|Independent
|Charles Berry Brown
|align="right"|5
|align="right"|2.75%
|align="right"|
|align="right"|unknown

|Independent
|David Cameron
|align="right"|31
|align="right"|17.03%
|align="right"|
|align="right"|unknown

|Independent
|Henry S. Caulier
|align="right"|9
|align="right"|4.95%
|align="right"|
|align="right"|unknown

|Independent
|Henry Cogan
|align="right"|34
|align="right"|18.68%
|align="right"|
|align="right"|unknown

|Independent
|William Fisher
|align="right"|29
|align="right"|15.93%
|align="right"|
|align="right"|unknown

|Independent
|Alexander Rocke Robertson
|align="right"|74
|align="right"|40.66%
|align="right"|
|align="right"|unknown
|- bgcolor="white"
!align="right" colspan=3|Total valid votes
!align="right"|182
!align="right"|100.00%
!align="right"|
!align="right"|
|- bgcolor="white"
!align="right" colspan=3|Total rejected ballots
!align="right"|
!align="right"|
!align="right"|
!align="right"|
|- bgcolor="white"
!align="right" colspan=3|Turnout
!align="right"|%
!align="right"|
!align="right"|
!align="right"|
|}

|-

|Independent
|Alexander Rocke Robinson
|align="right"|Acclaimed
|align="right"| -.- %
|align="right"|
|align="right"|unknown
|- bgcolor="white"
!align="right" colspan=3|Total valid votes
!align="right"|n/a
!align="right"| -.- %
!align="right"|
!align="right"|
|- bgcolor="white"
!align="right" colspan=3|Total rejected ballots
!align="right"|
!align="right"|
!align="right"|
!align="right"|
|- bgcolor="white"
!align="right" colspan=3|Turnout
!align="right"|%
!align="right"|
!align="right"|
!align="right"|
|- bgcolor="white"
!align="right" colspan=7|1 The byelection was called due to the resignation of A.R. Robertson upon appointment to Executive Council 14 November 1871. As this byelection writ was filled by acclamation, no polling day was required and the seat was filled within two weeks. The stated date is the date the return of writs was received by the Chief Electoral Officer.
|}

|-

|- bgcolor="white"
!align="right" colspan=3|Total valid votes
!align="right"|187
!align="right"|100.00%
!align="right"|
|- bgcolor="white"
!align="right" colspan=3|Total rejected ballots
!align="right"|
!align="right"|
!align="right"|
|- bgcolor="white"
!align="right" colspan=3|Turnout
!align="right"|%
!align="right"|
!align="right"|
|}

|-

|- bgcolor="white"
!align="right" colspan=3|Total valid votes
!align="right"|281
!align="right"|100.00%
!align="right"|
|- bgcolor="white"
!align="right" colspan=3|Total rejected ballots
!align="right"|
!align="right"|
!align="right"|
|- bgcolor="white"
!align="right" colspan=3|Turnout
!align="right"|%
!align="right"|
!align="right"|
|- bgcolor="white"
!align="right" colspan=7|2 The official returns gave Hett 74 votes and Pooley 73, but a B.C. Supreme Court decision altered the results and declared Pooley elected.
|}

|-

|- bgcolor="white"
!align="right" colspan=3|Total valid votes
!align="right"|415
!align="right"|100.00%
!align="right"|
|- bgcolor="white"
!align="right" colspan=3|Total rejected ballots
!align="right"|
!align="right"|
!align="right"|
|- bgcolor="white"
!align="right" colspan=3|Turnout
!align="right"|%
!align="right"|
!align="right"|
|}

|-

|- bgcolor="white"
!align="right" colspan=3|Total valid votes
!align="right"|401
!align="right"|100.00%
!align="right"|
|- bgcolor="white"
!align="right" colspan=3|Total rejected ballots
!align="right"|
!align="right"|
!align="right"|
|- bgcolor="white"
!align="right" colspan=3|Turnout
!align="right"|%
!align="right"|
!align="right"|
|}

|-

|- bgcolor="white"
!align="right" colspan=3|Total valid votes
!align="right"|--
!align="right"|--%
!align="right"|
|- bgcolor="white"
!align="right" colspan=3|Total rejected ballots
!align="right"|
!align="right"|
!align="right"|
|- bgcolor="white"
!align="right" colspan=3|Turnout
!align="right"|%
!align="right"|
!align="right"|
|}

|-

|- bgcolor="white"
!align="right" colspan=3|Total valid votes
!align="right"|869
!align="right"|100.00%
!align="right"|
|- bgcolor="white"
!align="right" colspan=3|Total rejected ballots
!align="right"|
!align="right"|
!align="right"|
|- bgcolor="white"
!align="right" colspan=3|Turnout
!align="right"|%
!align="right"|
!align="right"|
|- bgcolor="white"
!align="right" colspan=7|3 Results taken from the Victoria Colonist 12 July 1898. Although Bullen received more votes than Higgins, the B.C. Supreme Court controverted his election and declared Higgins elected instead.
|}

|-

|Independent Opposition
|William Henry Hayward
|align="right"|272
|align="right"|36.86%
|align="right"|
|align="right"|unknown

|Independent Opposition
|David Williams Higgins
|align="right"|111
|align="right"|15.04%
|align="right"|
|align="right"|unknown

|- bgcolor="white"
!align="right" colspan=3|Total valid votes
!align="right"|738
!align="right"|100.00%
!align="right"|
|- bgcolor="white"
!align="right" colspan=3|Total rejected ballots
!align="right"|
!align="right"|
!align="right"|
|- bgcolor="white"
!align="right" colspan=3|Turnout
!align="right"|%
!align="right"|
!align="right"|
|}

|-

|Liberal
|John Jardine
|align="right"|212
|align="right"|47.01%
|align="right"|
|align="right"|unknown

|- bgcolor="white"
!align="right" colspan=3|Total valid votes
!align="right"|451
!align="right"|100.00%
!align="right"|
|- bgcolor="white"
!align="right" colspan=3|Total rejected ballots
!align="right"|
!align="right"|
!align="right"|
|- bgcolor="white"
!align="right" colspan=3|Turnout
!align="right"|%
!align="right"|
!align="right"|
|- bgcolor="white"
!align="right" colspan=7|4Seat was reduced from two members to one.
|}

|-

|Liberal
|John Jardine
|align="right"|297
|align="right"|58.58%
|align="right"|
|align="right"|unknown

|- bgcolor="white"
!align="right" colspan=3|Total valid votes
!align="right"|507
!align="right"|100.00%
!align="right"|
|- bgcolor="white"
!align="right" colspan=3|Total rejected ballots
!align="right"|
!align="right"|
!align="right"|
|- bgcolor="white"
!align="right" colspan=3|Turnout
!align="right"|%
!align="right"|
!align="right"|
|}

|-

|Liberal
|John Jardine
|align="right"|436
|align="right"|54.64%
|align="right"|
|align="right"|unknown
|- bgcolor="white"
!align="right" colspan=3|Total valid votes
!align="right"|798
!align="right"|100.00%
!align="right"|
|- bgcolor="white"
!align="right" colspan=3|Total rejected ballots
!align="right"|
!align="right"|
!align="right"|
|- bgcolor="white"
!align="right" colspan=3|Turnout
!align="right"|%
!align="right"|
!align="right"|
|}

|Liberal
|Malcolm Bruce Jackson
|align="right"|151
|align="right"|17.64%

|- bgcolor="white"
!align="right" colspan=3|Total valid votes
!align="right"|856
!align="right"|100.00%
!align="right"|
|- bgcolor="white"
!align="right" colspan=3|Total rejected ballots
!align="right"|
!align="right"|
!align="right"|
|- bgcolor="white"
!align="right" colspan=3|Turnout
!align="right"|%
!align="right"|
!align="right"|
|}

|-

|Liberal
|Arthur William McCurdy
|align="right"|653
|align="right"|49.92%
|align="right"|
|align="right"|unknown

|- bgcolor="white"
!align="right" colspan=3|Total valid votes
!align="right"|1,308
!align="right"|100.00%
!align="right"|
|- bgcolor="white"
!align="right" colspan=3|Total rejected ballots
!align="right"|
!align="right"|
!align="right"|
|- bgcolor="white"
!align="right" colspan=3|Turnout
!align="right"|
!align="right"|
!align="right"|
|}

|-

|Socialist Labour
|Burges James Gadsden
|align="right"|479
|align="right"|20.63%
|align="right"|
|align="right"|unknown

|Liberal
|Henry Charles Helgesen
|align="right"|685
|align="right"|29.50%
|align="right"|
|align="right"|unknown

|- bgcolor="white"
!align="right" colspan=3|Total valid votes
!align="right"|2,322
!align="right"|100.00%
!align="right"|
|- bgcolor="white"
!align="right" colspan=3|Total rejected ballots
!align="right"|
!align="right"|
!align="right"|
|- bgcolor="white"
!align="right" colspan=3|Turnout
!align="right"|%
!align="right"|
!align="right"|
|}

|-

|Liberal
|Frank Robert Carlow
|align="right"|625
|align="right"|22.64%

|- bgcolor="white"
!align="right" colspan=3|Total valid votes
!align="right"|2,761
!align="right"|100.00%

|Liberal
|Mary Ellen Smith 6
|align="right"|1,077
|align="right"|18.65%
|align="right"|
|align="right"|unknown
|- bgcolor="white"
!align="right" colspan=3|Total valid votes
!align="right"|2,908
!align="right"|100.00%
!align="right"|
|- bgcolor="white"
!align="right" colspan=3|Total rejected ballots
!align="right"|92
!align="right"|
!align="right"|
|- bgcolor="white"
!align="right" colspan=3|Turnout
!align="right"|%
!align="right"|
!align="right"|
|- bgcolor="white"
!align="right" colspan=7|5 Independent in Summary of Votes.
|- bgcolor="white"
!align="right" colspan=7|6Mary Ellen Smith was the first female candidate to the BC Legislature.
|}

|-

|Independent
|John William Archer
|align="right"|67
|align="right"|1.70%
|align="right"|
|align="right"|unknown

|Conservative
|Elmer Victor Finland
|align="right"|1,462
|align="right"|41.60%
|align="right"|
|align="right"|unknown

|Co-operative Commonwealth Fed.
|William Donaldson Smith
|align="right"|765
|align="right"|19.38%
|align="right"|
|align="right"|unknown

|Liberal
|Charles Eustatius Whitney-Griffiths
|align="right"|1,416
|align="right"|35.88%
|align="right"|
|align="right"|unknown
|- bgcolor="white"
!align="right" colspan=3|Total valid votes
!align="right"|3,947
!align="right"|100.00%
!align="right"|
|- bgcolor="white"
!align="right" colspan=3|Total rejected ballots
!align="right"|28
!align="right"|
!align="right"|
|- bgcolor="white"
!align="right" colspan=3|Turnout
!align="right"|%
!align="right"|
!align="right"|
|}

|-

|Liberal
|Charles Taschereau Beard
|align="right"|1,348
|align="right"|35.06%
|align="right"|
|align="right"|unknown

|Conservative
|Elmer Victor Finland
|align="right"|1,554
|align="right"|40.42%
|align="right"|
|align="right"|unknown

|Co-operative Commonwealth Fed.
|Henry George Webber
|align="right"|943
|align="right"|24.53%
|align="right"|
|align="right"|unknown
|- bgcolor="white"
!align="right" colspan=3|Total valid votes
!align="right"|3,845
!align="right"|100.00%
!align="right"|
|- bgcolor="white"
!align="right" colspan=3|Total rejected ballots
!align="right"|134
!align="right"|
!align="right"|
|- bgcolor="white"
!align="right" colspan=3|Turnout
!align="right"|%
!align="right"|
!align="right"|
|}

|-

|Co-operative Commonwealth Fed.
|George Henry Webber
|align="right"|1,989
|align="right"|43.65%
|align="right"|
|align="right"|unknown
|- bgcolor="white"
!align="right" colspan=3|Total valid votes
!align="right"|4,557
!align="right"|100.00%
!align="right"|
|- bgcolor="white"
!align="right" colspan=3|Total rejected ballots
!align="right"|114
!align="right"|
!align="right"|
|- bgcolor="white"
!align="right" colspan=3|Turnout
!align="right"|%
!align="right"|
!align="right"|
|}

|Independent
|George Edward Bonner
|align="right"|1,554
|align="right"|40.42%

|- bgcolor="white"
!align="right" colspan=3|Total valid votes
!align="right"|8,231
!align="right"|100.00%
!align="right"|
|- bgcolor="white"
!align="right" colspan=3|Total rejected ballots
!align="right"|173
!align="right"|
!align="right"|
|- bgcolor="white"
!align="right" colspan=3|Turnout
!align="right"|%
!align="right"|
!align="right"|
|}

|Liberal
|Geoffrey Indnes Edgelow
|align="right"|2,294
|align="right"|25.33%
|align="right"|3,597
|align="right"|43.14%
|align="right"|
|align="right"|unknown

|Progressive Conservative
|Robert Hamilton Fort
|align="right"|1,550
|align="right"|17.11%
|align="right"|-
|align="right"| - %
|align="right"|
|align="right"|unknown

|Co-operative Commonwealth Fed.
|Frank Mitchell
|align="right"|3,607
|align="right"|39.83%
|align="right"|4,741
|align="right"|56.86%
|align="right"|
|align="right"|unknown
|- bgcolor="white"
!align="right" colspan=3|Total valid votes
!align="right"|9,057
!align="right"|%
!align="right"|8,338
!align="right"|100.00%
!align="right"|
|- bgcolor="white"
!align="right" colspan=3|Total rejected ballots
!align="right"|366
!align="right"|
!align="right"|
|- bgcolor="white"
!align="right" colspan=3|Turnout
!align="right"|%
!align="right"|
!align="right"|
|- bgcolor="white"
!align="right" colspan=9|7 Final count is between top two candidates from previous count; intermediary counts (of 3) not shown
|}

|Liberal
|Geofrey Innes Edgelow
|align="right"|1,998
|align="right"|22.62%
|align="right"|-
|align="right"| - %
|align="right"|
|align="right"|unknown

|Progressive Conservative
|Norman L. Goodwin
|align="right"|480
|align="right"|5.44
|align="right"| -
|align="right"| - %
|align="right"|
|align="right"|unknown

|Co-operative Commonwealth Fed.
|Frank Mitchell
|align="right"|3,089
|align="right"|34.98%
|align="right"|3,848
|align="right"|48.13%
|align="right"|
|align="right"|unknown
|- bgcolor="white"
!align="right" colspan=3|Total valid votes
!align="right"|8,831
!align="right"|100.00%
!align="right"|7,995
!align="right"|%
!align="right"|
|- bgcolor="white"
!align="right" colspan=3|Total rejected ballots
!align="right"|445
!align="right"|
!align="right"|
!align="right"|
!align="right"|
|- bgcolor="white"
!align="right" colspan=3|Total Registered Voters
!align="right"|
!align="right"|
!align="right"|
!align="right"|
!align="right"|
|- bgcolor="white"
!align="right" colspan=3|Turnout
!align="right"|%
!align="right"|
!align="right"|
!align="right"|
!align="right"|
|- bgcolor="white"
!align="right" colspan=9|8 Preferential ballot; final count is between top two candidates from first count; intermediary counts (of 3) not shown
|}

|Progressive Conservative
|George Brock Chisholm
|align="right"|821
|align="right"|10.16%
|align="right"|
|align="right"|unknown

|Co-operative Commonwealth Fed.
|Elvan Walters
|align="right"|2,013
|align="right"|24.92%
|align="right"|
|align="right"|unknown

|Liberal
|George Wilfrid Whittaker
|align="right"|1,714
|align="right"|21.22%
|align="right"|
|align="right"|unknown
|- bgcolor="white"
!align="right" colspan=3|Total valid votes
!align="right"|8,078
!align="right"|100.00%
!align="right"|
|- bgcolor="white"
!align="right" colspan=3|Total rejected ballots
!align="right"|110
!align="right"|
!align="right"|
|- bgcolor="white"
!align="right" colspan=3|Turnout
!align="right"|%
!align="right"|
!align="right"|
|}

|Progressive Conservative
|James Bryant
|align="right"|991
|align="right"|9.04%
|align="right"|
|align="right"|unknown

|Co-operative Commonwealth Fed.
|Geoffrey Harris Mitchell
|align="right"|3.383
|align="right"|30.84%
|align="right"|
|align="right"|unknown

|Liberal
|George Wilfrid Whittaker
|align="right"|2,165
|align="right"|19.74%
|align="right"|
|align="right"|unknown
|- bgcolor="white"
!align="right" colspan=3|Total valid votes
!align="right"|10,968
!align="right"|100.00%
!align="right"|
|- bgcolor="white"
!align="right" colspan=3|Total rejected ballots
!align="right"|126
!align="right"|
!align="right"|
|- bgcolor="white"
!align="right" colspan=3|Turnout
!align="right"|%
!align="right"|
!align="right"|
|}

|-

|Liberal
|David Alexander Elrix
|align="right"|1,867
|align="right"|16.40%
|align="right"|
|align="right"|unknown
|- bgcolor="white"
!align="right" colspan=3|Total valid votes
!align="right"|11,387
!align="right"|100.00%
!align="right"|
|- bgcolor="white"
!align="right" colspan=3|Total rejected ballots
!align="right"|285
!align="right"|
!align="right"|
|- bgcolor="white"
!align="right" colspan=3|Turnout
!align="right"|%
!align="right"|
!align="right"|
|}

|Liberal
|Frederick Henry Phillips
|align="right"|1,971
|align="right"|12.15%
|align="right"|
|align="right"|unknown
|- bgcolor="white"
!align="right" colspan=3|Total valid votes
!align="right"|16,221
!align="right"|100.00%
!align="right"|
|- bgcolor="white"
!align="right" colspan=3|Total rejected ballots
!align="right"|415
!align="right"|
!align="right"|
|- bgcolor="white"
!align="right" colspan=3|Turnout
!align="right"|%
!align="right"|
!align="right"|
|}

|Liberal
|Henry Donovan Joy
|align="right"|3,884
|align="right"|20.05%
|align="right"|
|align="right"|unknown

|Progressive Conservative
|John Sedgwick Williams
|align="right"|3,601
|align="right"|18.59%
|align="right"|
|align="right"|unknown
|- bgcolor="white"
!align="right" colspan=3|Total valid votes
!align="right"|19,373
!align="right"|100.00%
!align="right"|
|- bgcolor="white"
!align="right" colspan=3|Total rejected ballots
!align="right"|453
!align="right"|
!align="right"|
|- bgcolor="white"
!align="right" colspan=3|Turnout
!align="right"|%
!align="right"|
!align="right"|
|}

|-

|Independent
|John Strong Craggs
|align="right"|132
|align="right"|0.54%
|align="right"|
|align="right"|unknown

|Progressive Conservative
|Thelma Dawson
|align="right"|2,033
|align="right"|8.37%
|align="right"|
|align="right"|unknown

|Liberal
|Leonard J. Stephenson
|align="right"|977
|align="right"|4.02%
|align="right"|
|align="right"|unknown
|- bgcolor="white"
!align="right" colspan=3|Total valid votes
!align="right"|24,295
!align="right"|100.00%
!align="right"|
|- bgcolor="white"
!align="right" colspan=3|Total rejected ballots
!align="right"|417
!align="right"|
!align="right"|
|- bgcolor="white"
!align="right" colspan=3|Turnout
!align="right"|%
!align="right"|
!align="right"|
|}

Subsequent elections
After the 32nd general election in 1979, the riding of Esquimalt was incorporated into the new riding of Esquimalt-Port Renfrew.

Sources
Elections BC website - historical election data

Former provincial electoral districts of British Columbia on Vancouver Island